Jurków may refer to the following places in Poland:
Jurków, Lower Silesian Voivodeship (south-west Poland)
Jurków, Brzesko County in Lesser Poland Voivodeship (south Poland)
Jurków, Limanowa County in Lesser Poland Voivodeship (south Poland)
Jurków, Świętokrzyskie Voivodeship (south-central Poland)